Ipswich High School is a public high school in Ipswich, Massachusetts, United States, which serves students from grades nine through twelve. It is the only high school in the town of Ipswich. As of 2019, the school's principal is Jonathan Mitchell. Ipswich High School shares a building with Ipswich Middle School.

Athletics
Ipswich High School is a member of the Cape Ann League, and is a Division II competitor in the Massachusetts Interscholastic Athletic Association. Sports teams are known as the Tigers, and school colors are orange, white, and black.

Ipswich offers sports in the fall, winter, and spring seasons. Fall sports are cheerleading, cross country, field hockey, football, golf, soccer, and volleyball. Winter sports are basketball, gymnastics (co-op at Gloucester), ice hockey (co-op at Rockport), indoor track, swim, and wrestling (co-op at Georgetown). In the spring, baseball, lacrosse, softball, tennis, and track and field are played.

Clubs and activities 
Ipswich High School offers many clubs and activities for all students to participate in. These allow students to take advantage of leadership opportunities, to explore their interests, and make their community a better place. Any clubs or activities that do not currently exist at Ipswich High School can be started with approval from principal, Mr. Mitchell.

The current clubs and activities at IHS are as follows: art club, athletics, the Chameleon, Close-Up, Coding Club, Dungeons and Dragons, GSA, Environmental Club, Intramural Volleyball, Interact Club, Math League, Model UN, Music Programs, NHS, Pure Pals, Robotics, Ski Club, Tiger Transcript, World Language Club, Yearbook and Yoga Club.

Art Club 
The IHS Art Club meets after school when students can use their free time to create works of art. This is a great opportunity to explore creativity with classmates and to express themselves through various forms of art.

Athletics 
Soccer, Football, Field Hockey, Cross Country, Softball, Cheerleading, Golf, Basketball, Ice Hockey, Track (indoor & outdoor), Tennis, Lacrosse, Baseball, Swimming, Co-op Wrestling, Co-op Gymnastics.

The Chameleon 
The Chameleon is Ipswich High School's Literary Magazine. It is published during the school year with student submissions of literary works. The submissions vary from poetry to short stories to songs.

Close-Up (Washington D.C.) 
The Close-Up Trip is a week long field trip to Washington, D.C.. The tour includes the Air and Space Museum, American History Museum, Holocaust Museum, the Jefferson, Franklin, Delano, Roosevelt, and Martin Luther King Jr. Memorials, and the WWII, Korean, Vietnam, and Lincoln Memorials. The students also get a tour of the Capitol Building and visited the Arlington National Cemetery along with the Smithsonian Museum of African American History and Culture and the White House. In addition to the walking tours throughout the city, students also attend debates, seminars, and simulations, which provide lots of information about the government and current issues in the country.

Coding Club 
Coding Club meets before school where students can collaborate on computer programs. Students write code in multiple languages and work together to present a project for the school's STEAM Fair.

Dungeons and Dragons 
Dungeons and Dragons club is where students with interests in role-play and table games can meet and play their games as well as discuss other games.

GSA (Gender Sexuality Alliance) 
Gender Sexuality Alliance, formerly Gay Straight Alliance, is a club that provides a safe place for everyone with any identity. They provide support to all communities within IHS and bring awareness to the importance of understanding how individuals can identify.

Environmental Club 
Environmental Club meets weekly to brainstorm ideas for projects to create a more sustainable community. The club also helps maintain the garden in the front of the school as well as raise money by selling reusable water bottles.

Intramural Volleyball 
Intramural Volleyball meets after school for two weeks in the fall. Students create teams within their grade to compete against other grades.

Interact Club 
Interact Club works together with Ipswich Rotary Club to conduct local community events and activities. The major events put on by Interact include the annual Jingle Bell Walk, Polar Plunge, and many more smaller activities to benefit the community.

Math League 
Math League meets after school for students to prepare for upcoming Math League competitions. Ipswich High School's team competes against surrounding towns.

Model UN 
Model UN is a trip students take to compete in the Model UN conference. This conference offers students the opportunity to learn about diplomacy, international relations, and the United Nations through interactive activities.

Music Program 
Jazz, Pep and Concert Bands, Bel Canto, Treble Choir, Concert Choir, Chamber Singers, Orchestra, Symphony Orchestra, Chamber Orchestra & String Quartet.

NHS (National Honors Society) 
National Honors Society (NHS) is group for which students are invited based on their academic standing, leadership, and community service. These students work together to host events throughout the school year for the school community as well as the community of Ipswich. Some notable events are the Senior Citizen Prom, a 5k run, and many more.

Pure Pals 
Pure Pals integrates leaders with students in the special education system. This provides opportunities for students to meet others and learn to be inclusive towards one another. The group also has many fun activities to participate in such as art, games, and many more.

Robotics Club 
Robotics club works throughout the school year to create robots to compete later in the year. Along with the engineering classes, the robotics club works with robotic cars and programs them.

Ski Club 
Ski Club allows students the opportunity to go to a ski mountain to ski. The club provides a bus to the mountain and anyone can participate.

Tiger Transcript 
The Tiger Transcript is the school newspaper. Upperclassmen English classes write articles for the newspaper about recent local events.

World Languages Club 
World Languages Club raises money for students around the world in struggling countries while also working to help students in languages at school if they are struggling.

Yearbook 
The Yearbook Club is actually a class students can take for academic credit. Yearbook works diligently to create the yearbook for the current school year. They write articles, conduct interviews and take pictures at school events.

Yoga Club 
The yoga club meets during free period in school where students can meet in the aerobics room to do yoga and relax.

Graduation requirements
In order to graduate from Ipswich High School, a total of 115 credits must be earned, with a minimum of 30 credits per year. This includes the successful completion of the following categories _207–2018):

*Juniors and Seniors may choose to replace this with participation in a sport.

References

Cape Ann League
Schools in Essex County, Massachusetts
Public high schools in Massachusetts
Buildings and structures in Ipswich, Massachusetts